Nibulon is a Ukrainian agricultural company specializing in production and export of grains such as wheat, barley and corn. It is headquartered in Mykolaiv. It is the only agricultural company in Ukraine with its own fleet and shipyard.

In 1991 the joint venture of the Mykolaiv businessman Oleksiy Vadaturskyi, the Hungarian and British firms (KOMBISEED KFT and Meridian Commodities Ltd) is created. The name of the company was formed after the first letters of the cities where the co-founders came from: Mykolaiv - Budapest - London.

In 1998, the agricultural holding for the first time received a direct loan of $ 5 million from the International Bank for Reconstruction and Development (IBRD), becoming the first Ukrainian farmer to receive such financing. The funds were used to expand exports.

Attracting a foreign loan gave impetus to the development of the company. A 15 December 2004, World Bank report (IBRD, one of its divisions) stated that each dollar invested in a NIBULON credit line generated $ 4–5.

Nibulon plans to increase the volume of river freight to 1 million tons.

In 2017 the company announced that it expands its logistical capabilities after acquiring 60 new tractors.

In 2018 it was announced that the company is involved in a construction project of new deep water seaport in Kherson Oblast, Dnieper-Buh Estuary.

In 2022 AP News reported that Oleksiy Vadaturskyi and his wife were killed as a result of a Russian rocket hitting their home.

See also 
 Nibulon Shipbuilding-Shiprepair Plant

References

External links
 
 The 200 biggest companies of Ukraine in 2017. Censor.net. 6 September 2018

Agriculture companies of Ukraine
Grain elevators
Agriculture companies established in 1991
Economy of Mykolaiv Oblast
Ukrainian companies established in 1991
Companies based in Mykolaiv